Joe Perry is the first solo album by Aerosmith guitarist Joe Perry, released on May 3, 2005, on Sony BMG. Joe Perry is his first solo album without The Joe Perry Project. The album peaked at No. 110 at the Billboard charts. Joe Perry was released as a regular CD and a DualDisc.

Joe Perry performed all guitars, bass, keyboards and vocals on the record leaving only the drums and percussion to the album's co-producer, Paul Caruso.

This album contains a cover of "The Crystal Ship", a song by The Doors.

Track listing
 "Shakin' My Cage"
 "Hold on Me"
 "Pray for Me"
 "Can't Compare"
 "Lonely"
 "Crystal Ship"
 "Talk Talkin'"
 "Push Comes to Shove"
 "Twilight"
 "Ten Years"
 "Vigilante Man"
 "Dying to Be Free"
 "Mercy"

DVD (DualDisc only)

Entire album in 5.1 Surround Sound
Exclusive in-the-studio, behind-the-scenes and interview footage
Exclusive UMixIt tracks for a unique interactive computer experience

Personnel
Joe Perry - Guitars, bass guitar, synth guitar, keys, lead and backing vocals (except in "Talk Talkin'")
Paul Caruso - Drums, hand percussion, drum programming
The Bonaires - Backing vocals on "Talk Talkin' (The Bonaires are Billie Paulette Montgomery Perry (Joe's wife), Roman Perry (Joe's younger son), Paul Caruso and Jim Survis)
Chris Noyes - Analog synth on "Ten Years"
All lyrics by Joe Perry except "Crystal Ship" (The Doors) and "Vigilante Man" (Woody Guthrie)
Produced by Joe Perry
Co-Produced by Paul Caruso
Recorded and engineered at The Boneyard by Paul Caruso
Cover picture by Ross Halfin

Three of the songs from the album ("Mercy", "Shakin' My Cage" and "Talk Talkin'") are included as playable bonus tracks in Guitar Hero: Aerosmith.

Charts

References

External links 
Official Website
www.joeperrysrockyourworld.com

2005 debut albums
Joe Perry (musician) albums